Halimolobos is a genus of flowering plants in the family Brassicaceae known generally as fissureworts. These are biennial and perennial herbs which are mostly native to North America, especially Mexico.

Species include:
Halimolobos diffusa - spreading fissurewort
Halimolobos jaegeri - Mojave halimolobos
Halimolobos mollis - soft fissurewort
Halimolobos perplexa - perplexed halimolobos
Halimolobos virgata - rod halimolobos
Halimolobos whitedii - Whited's fissurewort

References

External links 
 Jepson Manual Treatment
 USDA Plants Profile
 

Brassicaceae
Brassicaceae genera